Herbert Maurice Voland (October 2, 1918 – April 26, 1981) was an American actor, best known for his various roles on the sitcom Bewitched, as General Crandell Clayton on the sitcom M*A*S*H during seasons one and two, and the film Airplane! (1980).

Career
Voland was born in New Rochelle, New York and attended Columbia University.  After graduating, he studied at the American Theatre Wing before beginning his professional acting career on the Broadway stage, where his credits include Farewell, Farewell Eugene (1960) and Someone Waiting (1955).

After World War II, he began appearing on television during the medium's Golden Age and was a regular on such series as Omnibus, The Philco Television Playhouse and Studio One.

Later, he became known for his prolific portrayal of characters on 1960s and 1970s television that were most commonly gruff executives, huff-and-puff military officers, or policemen, either in light sitcoms or crime dramas.

As a member of the cast of television programs, he played Neil Ogilvie on Arnie, Fred Hammond on Love on a Rooftop, General Crandell Clayton on M*A*S*H, Harry Masterson on Mr. Deeds Goes to Town, and Dr. Butler on The Mothers-in-Law. He also played Osborne, a con artist, on Sanford and Son.

Personal life
Voland was the father of the television actor Mark Voland.

Death
Voland died of a stroke on April 26, 1981, in Riverside, California and his ashes were scattered at sea. He was survived by his wife, Jean (Carlton), a singer, sons Mark and John and three siblings.

Filmography

1952
The Hunter (TV series) – "Rendezvous in Prague" – Voralov
1957
Studio One in Hollywood (TV series) – "A Matter of Guilt" – Bauer
1960
The Robert Herridge Theater (TV series) – "The Lottery" – Mr. Adams
The Iceman Cometh (TV movie) – Moran
Play of the Week (TV series) – "The Iceman Cometh: Parts 1 & 2" – Moran
1961
Naked City (TV series) – "Sweet Prince of Delancey Street" – Charlie Bates 
Route 66 (TV series) – "Incident on a Bridge" – Hodges
Great Ghost Tales (TV series) – "August Heat"
1962
Route 66 (TV series) – "Two on the House"  – Bill Garrison
1964
The Defenders (TV series) – "Blacklist" – Lloyd Hickman
East Side/West Side (TV series) – "The Givers" – Gabe Connors
Mr. Broadway (TV series) – "Bad Little Rich Girl" – Walter Hart
1965
The Virginian (TV series) – "Farewell to Honesty" -Judge Charles Dodge
Perry Mason (TV series) – "The Case of the Duplicate Case" – Ernest Hill
Profiles in Courage (TV series) – George Mason Peckham
I Dream of Jeannie (TV series) – "Whatever Became of Baby Custer?" – Major Jamison
The Wackiest Ship in the Army (TV series) – "...and Tyler Too"
The F.B.I. (TV series) – "Pound of Flesh"  – Charles Buford
1966
The Chase - Dental Delegate (uncredited)
Love on a Rooftop (TV series) 1966-1967 – 15 episodes – Fred Hammond
Voyage to the Bottom of the Sea (TV series) – "The Death Ship" – Carter
Scalplock (TV movie) – Buckeye Sullivan
Gidget (TV series) – "I Have This Friend Who" – Mel
The Iron Horse (TV series) – "Joy Unconfined" – Buckeye
1967
Judd for the Defense (TV series) – "The Deep End" – Judge Balfour
Mannix (TV series) – "Beyond the Shadow of a Dream" – Frank Terrano
The Second Hundred Years (TV series) – "The Abominable Iceman" – Mr. L
Bewitched (TV series) (1967–1972) – 6 episodes – Judge, Mr. Ferber, E.J. Haskell, Mr. Traynor, Mr. Hascomb
1968
He & She (TV series) – "Goodman, Spare That Tree" – Goodman
The Mothers-In-Law (TV series) 3 episodes (1968–1969) – Dr. Butler
Hallmark Hall of Fame (TV series) – "Elizabeth the Queen" – Captain Armin
Don't Just Stand There! – Moffat
The Shakiest Gun in the West – Dr. Friedlander
With Six You Get Eggroll – Harry Scott
Bonanza (TV series) – "Different Pines, Same Wind" – Jason Milburn
Petticoat Junction (TV series) – "Birthplace of a Future President" – Mr. Andrews
The Good Guys (TV series) – "Episode #1.2" – Peckinpaw
1969
The Ghost & Mrs. Muir (TV series) – "Strictly Relative" – Ralph Muir
The Outsider (TV series) – "Handle with Care" – Hollis
The Love God? – Atty. Gen. Frederick Snow
Mr. Deeds Goes to Town (TV series) – Henry Masterson
In Name Only (TV movie) – Sergeant Mulligan
1970
Green Acres (TV series) – "Bundle of Joy" – Judd Carling
Love, American Style (TV series) Mr. Dunlap & Phil
The Name of the Game (TV series) – "The Other Kind of Spy" – Harvy
Get Smart (TV series) – "Do I Hear a Vaults?" – C. Barton Neff
Arnie (TV series) (1970–1972) – 15 Episodes – Neil Ogilvie
1972
M*A*S*H (TV series) (1972–1973) – 7 episodes – Gen. Crandell Clayton
Another Nice Mess – Spiro Agnew
The Paul Lynde Show (TV series) – 2 episodes – T.J. McNish
1973
Sanford and Son (TV series) – "Pot Luck" – Mr. Osborne
McCloud (TV series) – "Butch Cassidy Rides Again" – Mr. Winston
1974
Happy Days (TV series) – "Guess Who's Coming to Visit" – Police Sergeant
Death Sentence (TV movie) Lowell Hayes
Emergency! (TV series) – "Surprise" – Harry
The Manhandlers – Pruitt
1975
Doc (TV series) – "Dog vs. Doc" – Judge
All in the Family (TV series) – "Birth of the Baby: Part 1" – Ed Bradley
1976
Harry O (TV series) – "Forbidden City" – Sgt. Grady
The New Adventures of Wonder Woman (TV series) – "Wonder Woman vs. Gargantua" – Dr. Osmond
1977
American Raspberry – Admiral Taft
The Death of Richie (TV movie) – Morris Polk
Starsky and Hutch (TV series) – "The Psychic" – Joe Haymes
Tail Gunner Joe (TV movie) – Sen. Raymond Baldwin
The Hardy Boys/Nancy Drew Mysteries (TV series) – Chief Collig
The San Pedro Beach Bums (TV series) – "A Bum Thanksgiving" – Covington
The Jeffersons (TV series) – "The Costume Party" – Mr. Fletcher
C.P.O. Sharkey (TV series) – "Natalie's Ultimatum" – Clerk
1978
The Love Boat (TV series) – 3 episodes – Herb Lawrence, Sheila's Father 
Big Wednesday – minor role
1979
The North Avenue Irregulars – Dr. Fulton
Trapper John, M.D. (TV series)  – Barton
1980
Airplane! – Air Controller Macias
Below the Belt
The Formula – Geologist #3
Getting Wasted – Principal McLaughlin
1981
The Munsters' Revenge (TV movie) – Police Chief Harry Boyle
Flo (TV series) – "The Daynce" (final appearance)

References

External links

1918 births
1981 deaths
American male film actors
Male actors from New Rochelle, New York
American male stage actors
20th-century American male actors
American male television actors